Kylie Ireland (born May 26, 1970) is an American pornographic actress, film director, producer, publicist, and satellite radio show host. She is an inductee into the AVN, XRCO, and NightMoves Halls of Fame.

Early life and education 
Ireland was born on May 26, 1970, in Longmont, Colorado, a small community outside Denver. She grew up a good student until her parents divorced when she was 13. At 15, she became rebellious and started taking recreational drugs, until her father sent her to live with her mother, who had remarried, in San Diego, California. In San Diego, Ireland returned to getting good grades, graduated high school, and started college, majoring in broadcast journalism. While going to high school and college, Ireland worked part-time ordering videos for a chain of video stores, which she credits for learning a lot about pornographic films.

Career 
Ireland returned to Colorado to continue college partially in Boulder, Colorado, partially in Fort Collins, Colorado, and began to dance in a Fort Collins strip club. One of her first female lovers was a waitress at the same club who would become the pornographic actress Juli Ashton.

She entered the pornographic film industry in 1994, through an acquaintance with glamour photographer Warren Tang. Her first films were L'il Ms. Behaved, where she performed with Randy West, and Up & Cummers 10, with Jenna Jameson; she started at the same time as Jameson. Ireland moved to Los Angeles after her first five films, and performed in a total of 80 films her first year, before returning to Colorado intending to slow down her film work.

From 1995 to 2000, Ireland performed in exclusive contracts, starring in a few films per year, while traveling across America and Europe, strip tease dancing and promoting her films. Her first contract, with Sin City Entertainment, was brief, and ended in a breach of contract small claims court lawsuit which went before Judge Judy on television; Ireland won. That was followed by a five-year contract with VCA Pictures. Ireland served as VCA's Director of Publicity from 1999 to 2000, before returning to performing freelance. Demonstrating that no hard feelings remained about the lawsuit, she had a one-month stint as Director of Publicity for Sin City in April 2003. In 1996, during her time at VCA, Ireland returned to her natural red hair.

Recognition 
In January 1995 Ireland was awarded AVN Best New Starlet by Adult Video News Magazine. This would be the first of many adult film awards. Fans of X-Rated Entertainment awarded her the 'Vixen' award in 1995 and the 'Fan Favorite' in 1996. She was named by Playboy Magazine as one of their Top 10 Porn Stars for 1997. In 2001, AVN listed her among the Top 50 Porn Stars of All Time and in 2005 inducted her into the AVN Hall of Fame.

Directing 
When her contract with VCA expired, Ireland directed her first movie, The Whore Next Door. Ireland continued to direct, first for Jewel De'Nyle at Platinum X Pictures, then other companies. In April 2006, she founded her own adult film company, SlutWerkz, which features women directors and Cross as head of production, producing, and starring in hardcore gonzo pornography. SlutWerkz launch was delayed from its planned fall 2007 to sometime in 2008 after replacing the original intended distributors.  The company originally planned to release one film per month.

Internet 

Ireland started her personal website in 1996, becoming one of the first pornographic actresses on the Web; she describes it as "my obsession." On her website, she would perform live sex shows that would receive 10,000 hits a day at $5 a hit during the late 1990s. She does Web consulting and public relations for other adult actresses.

Other ventures 
From October 2003 to February 2006, Ireland hosted a weekly Internet radio show, Kylie Live on ksexradio.com, about the pornography industry. She won the KSEX Radio Listener's Choice Award for "Best Radio Voice" in 2004, and the "Best Insight into the Adult Business" award for 2005. In February 2006, Ireland became the host of sex talk show Private Calls, on Friday evenings for Playboy Radio on Sirius Radio.

In November 2010, Ireland launched a new weekend show on Spice radio called The Jerkbox. The show took over where The Friday Night Threeway left off. It features guest interviews, segments revolving around the world of sex and porn-related topics.

Around January 2011, Ireland started a website called Bombed Out LA along with her husband, which uses her love of photography to capture and publish street art in Los Angeles.

In March 2011, it was discovered after a television interview that Ireland was also street artist DeeKay.

In January 2013, after leaving Spice radio, Ireland joined the Toadhopnetwork and began The Wednesday Night Threeway, a weekly podcast with Raylene and Derrick Pierce.

In April 2013, Ireland launched her own weekly podcast channel along with her husband Andy Appleton called Apples & Pairs on SoundCloud.com.

Personal life 
Ireland got divorced after a ten-year marriage to a man outside of porn. They had been married three years prior to the start of her career in pornography, and she stated that the divorce was not due to her career.

Ireland says that she "dabbled" in recreational drugs, even before entering the adult industry; she tried most drugs, and used crystal meth for a time to stay thin, but her main drug of choice was alcohol. In 2001, she realized her drinking was becoming a problem.

As of 2007, Ireland lived in a renovated 1927  warehouse loft in downtown Los Angeles with pornographic director Eli Cross, her boyfriend of six years.

In 2010, Ireland and Eli split up and she later married English retired nightclub manager Andy Appleton. Following a whirlwind romance, she now lives just outside Los Angeles.

Awards 
1995 AVN Award – Best New Starlet
1995 F.O.X.E. Award – Vixen
1995 NightMoves Award – Best Actress
1996 F.O.X.E. Award – Fan Favorite
2005 AVN Hall of Fame
2006 XRCO Hall of Fame
2007 NightMoves Triple Play Award (Dancing/Performing/Directing)
2008 XRCO Award – MILF of the Year
2008 AVN Award – Best Supporting Actress – Film – Layout
2008 AVN Award – Best Oral Scene – Film – Layout 
2009 NightMoves Hall of Fame

References

External links 

 
 
 
 

1970 births
American bloggers
American pornographic film actresses
American pornographic film directors
American pornographic film producers
American publicists
American radio personalities
American women in business
American women writers
Living people
People from Longmont, Colorado
Pornographic film actors from Colorado
American women bloggers
Women pornographic film directors
Film directors from Colorado
AVN Award winners
21st-century American women